Delaware Punch is a fruit-flavored soft drink. Its formula uses a blend of fruit flavors, with grape (Methyl anthranilate) being the most prominent. It is not carbonated and is caffeine-free.

Delaware Punch was created by Job Daniel Rubio Delgado in 1913. The brand is currently owned by The Coca-Cola Company, but has been discontinued. 
The beverage is difficult to find, but is still served in some restaurants in Houston, Texas, including James Coney Island. It is also sold in certain grocery stores in  Arkansas, Louisiana, and Texas. Delaware Punch can also be found for sale on eBay. Blooms Candy in Carrollton, TX regularly stocks Delaware Punch in single cans and 12 packs. It is also sold in Louisiana in 20oz. bottles. Delaware Punch concentrate can be purchased from several online soft drink retailers. The bottled form is sold in Guatemala and Mexico. Delaware Punch was commonly sold at the New Orleans drug store chain K&B, before it was bought by Rite Aid in 1997. The drink can be found in Latin American convenience stores.

Delaware Punch is named for the Delaware grape cultivar from which its flavor is derived.  The grape was first grown in Delaware County, Ohio, and the drink therefore has no affiliation with the state of Delaware.

References

Grape sodas
Coca-Cola brands
Products introduced in 1913
Discontinued soft drinks
Products and services discontinued in 2020